Roanoke City School District is a school district located in Roanoke, Randolph County, Alabama.

Schools
Handley High School
Handley Middle School
Knight Enloe Elementary School

External links
 

Education in Randolph County, Alabama